Leutnant Hanns Joachim Wolff was a World War I German flying ace credited with ten aerial victories.

Early life
Hans Joachim Wolff was born in Mühlhausen, the German Empire, on 24 September 1895.

Aerial service
Wolff served with FA(A) 216 until 6 July 1917, when he was reassigned to Jagdstaffel 11. He was wounded in action fighting No. 1 Squadron RNAS on 14 August, and again on 23 November in combat against No. 56 Squadron RFC. On 18 March 1918, Wolff shot down and killed his first victim, which was possibly Lt. John McCudden. Wolff then steadily scored for the next two months, downing his tenth victim on 15 May 1918. He and his Fokker Dr.I were shot down the following day, most probably by Lt. Horace Barton of No. 24 Squadron RAF. He's the only German pilot who scored all of his victories in the Fokker Dr.I.

References

Bibliography 
Above the Lines: The Aces and Fighter Units of the German Air Service, Naval Air Service and Flanders Marine Corps 1914 - 1918 Norman L. R. Franks, et al. Grub Street, 1993. , .

1895 births
1918 deaths
German World War I flying aces
Luftstreitkräfte personnel
German military personnel killed in World War I
Aviators killed by being shot down
People from Mühlhausen
People from the Province of Saxony
Military personnel from Thuringia